On August 9, 1934, U.S. President Franklin D. Roosevelt implemented the seizure of all silver situated in the continental United States with Executive Order 6814 - Requiring the Delivery of All Silver to the United States for Coinage.

Executive Order 6814 closely mirrors Executive Order 6102, which FDR signed on April 5, 1933, "forbidding the Hoarding of Gold Coin, Gold Bullion, and Gold Certificates within the continental United States" with some differences.  A key difference was that EO 6814 excluded the seizure of all silver coins, whether foreign or domestic, while EO 6102 only exempted from seizure certain types of collectible or numismatic coins.

See also 

 Executive Order 6102 - Requiring Gold Coin, Gold Bullion and Gold Certificates to Be Delivered to the Government
 Executive Order 6260 - On Hoarding and Exporting Gold
 Gold Standard Repeal 1933
 Silver Purchase Act of 1934
 Gold Reserve Act of 1934
 Silver Coinage Act of 1939
 Silver Purchase Act of 1946
 Silver Purchase Repeal Act of 1963
 Coinage Act of 1965
 Silver Certificate Act of 1967
 Coinage Act of 1978

References 

Executive orders of Franklin D. Roosevelt